Nasswald Peak is located on the border of Alberta and British Columbia on the Continental Divide. It was named in 1913 by the Interprovincial Boundary Survey after Nasswald, a town in Austria.

See also
 List of peaks on the British Columbia–Alberta border

References

Mountains of Banff National Park
Three-thousanders of Alberta
Three-thousanders of British Columbia
Canadian Rockies
Mount Assiniboine Provincial Park